This is a list of U.S. routes in Kentucky.

List

See also

References

 
U.S. Highways